Xylopia hastarum is a species of plant in the Annonaceae family. It is endemic to Jamaica.  It is threatened by habitat loss.

References

hastarum
Endemic flora of Jamaica
Taxonomy articles created by Polbot